Gillenia stipulata, or American ipecac, is an herbacious perennial plant in the genus Gillenia, in the family Rosaceae, native to the United States from Texas to the west and south, New York to the North, and North Carolina to the east. The species grows in dry uplands and open woods, usually on acidic soils.

References

stipulata
Flora of the Northeastern United States
Flora of the Southeastern United States
Flora of the Great Lakes region (North America)
Flora of the United States
Taxa named by Gotthilf Heinrich Ernst Muhlenberg
Flora without expected TNC conservation status